Sachai Ki Taqat  is a 1989 Indian Hindi-language film directed by T. Rama Rao and starring Dharmendra, Govinda, Amrita Singh, Sonam.

Cast
Ashok Kumar as Janardan 
 Dharmendra as Constable Ram Singh
 Govinda as Sagar Singh
 Amrita Singh as Durga Singh 
 Sonam as Rekha 
 Anupam Kher as DCP Agarwal
 Shakti Kapoor as Dr. Narendra
 Om Shivpuri as Commissioner of Police
 Kunika as Laxmi 
 Tej Sapru as Tony Fernandes
 Manik Irani as Rony
 Bob Christo
 Roopesh Kumar 
 Seema Deo as Durga's Mother
 Dinesh Hingoo as Marwadi Seth

Soundtrack

References

External links
 

1989 films
1980s Hindi-language films
Films directed by T. Rama Rao
Films scored by Laxmikant–Pyarelal